Qazi Khan (also Romanized as Qāẕī Khān) is a village in Emam Rural District, Ziviyeh District in Saqqez County, Kurdistan Province, Iran. At the 2006 census, its population was 43, in 8 families. The village is populated by Kurds.

References 

Towns and villages in Saqqez County
Kurdish settlements in Kurdistan Province